Ann-Sophie Duyck (born 23 July 1987) is a Belgian triathlete and former racing cyclist, who rode professionally between 2012 and 2021 for six different teams. She competed in the 2013 UCI women's team time trial in Florence. By winning her fourth Belgian National Time Trial Championships in 2017, Duyck became the first Belgian road cyclist to win four consecutive titles in their discipline.

Major results

2011
 1st Time trial, West Flanders Provincial Road Championships
 6th Time trial, National Road Championships
2012
 3rd Time trial, National Road Championships
 9th Chrono des Nations
 10th Time trial, UCI Road World Championships
2013
 1st Time trial, West Flanders Provincial Road Championships
 1st Borlo Chrono (April)
 1st Borlo Chrono (May)
 9th Time trial, National Road Championships
2014
 1st  Time trial, National Road Championships
 1st Time trial, West Flanders Provincial Road Championships
 1st Erondegemse Pijl
 3rd Overall Trophée d'Or Féminin
1st Stage 2 (ITT)
 4th Chrono Champenois-Trophée Européen
 5th Time trial, UCI Road World Championships
2015
 1st  Time trial, National Road Championships
 1st Time trial, West Flanders Provincial Road Championships
 1st Chrono Champenois
 1st Stage 1 (ITT) Auensteiner–Radsporttage
 2nd Ljubljana–Domžale–Ljubljana TT
 3rd Chrono des Nations
 6th Overall BeNe Ladies Tour
 6th Overall Trophée d'Or Féminin
1st Stage 1 (ITT)
 7th Time trial, European Games
 9th Time trial, UCI Road World Championships
2016
 1st  Time trial, National Road Championships
 1st Ljubljana–Domžale–Ljubljana TT
 1st Chrono des Nations
 2nd Overall Tour de Bretagne Féminin
 6th Time trial, UEC European Road Championships
 7th Chrono Champenois
 8th Time trial, UCI Road World Championships
 8th Overall Gracia–Orlová
1st Stage 3 (ITT)
2017
 1st  Time trial, National Road Championships
 1st Time trial, West Flanders Provincial Road Championships
 1st Ljubljana–Domžale–Ljubljana TT
 1st Stage 3 (ITT) Tour de Feminin-O cenu Českého Švýcarska
 2nd  Time trial, UEC European Road Championships
 2nd Chrono des Nations
 3rd Overall Tour de Feminin-O cenu Českého Švýcarska
1st Stage 3 (ITT)
 5th Overall Setmana Ciclista Valenciana
1st  Mountains classification
1st Stage 2
 8th Overall Emakumeen Euskal Bira
 8th Overall Thüringen Rundfahrt der Frauen
 8th Grand Prix de Plumelec-Morbihan Dames
 9th Overall Grand Prix Elsy Jacobs
 10th Dwars door Vlaanderen
2018
 1st  Time trial, National Road Championships
 1st Time trial, West Flanders Provincial Road Championships
 3rd Crescent Vårgårda TTT
 3rd Team time trial, Ladies Tour of Norway
 5th Ljubljana–Domžale–Ljubljana TT
 5th Chrono Champenois
 6th Chrono des Nations
 9th Time trial, UEC European Road Championships
 Combativity award Stage 3 The Women's Tour
2019
 2nd Road race, National Road Championships
2021
 1st Time trial, West Flanders Provincial Road Championships
 8th Chrono des Nations

References

External links
 

1987 births
Living people
Belgian female cyclists
Belgian female triathletes
People from Roeselare
Cyclists at the 2015 European Games
European Games competitors for Belgium
Cyclists from West Flanders
Cyclists at the 2016 Summer Olympics
Olympic cyclists of Belgium
21st-century Belgian women